This article presents the discography for the American band Huey Lewis and the News. Huey Lewis and the News have sold over 30 million albums worldwide and are ranked in the top 200 selling groups of all time by the Recording Industry Association of America.

Three of their albums, Sports, Fore!, and Small World have been certified platinum (which in the United States market is equivalent to one million units sold). Sports is the band's best selling album, having been certified 7× platinum. Picture This and Hard at Play have both been certified gold. The band has released 37 singles, of which 12 have reached the top ten, and three have reached number one on the Billboard Hot 100.

The band has also appeared on two soundtrack albums. For the 1985 film, Back to the Future, the band contributed two songs. "The Power of Love" became their first number-one hit, and "Back in Time" received radio airplay on album-oriented rock stations. More than 20 years later, the band contributed the title track, appearing over the end credits, to the 2008 film Pineapple Express.

The band has released three compilation albums. The first one, released worldwide (except in the U.S.), peaked at number 23 on the UK chart. The second one, Time Flies... The Best of Huey Lewis & the News was released in the U.S. only and included four newly recorded tracks. The third one was a career-spanning "greatest hits" album that included some harder-to-find tracks and was certified gold. The band has also released one live album.

Albums

Studio albums

Compilation albums

Live albums

Singles

Video releases

Other appearances

References

External links
 
 Entry at 45cat.com
 

Discographies of American artists
Rock music group discographies
Discography